The fawn-breasted waxbill (Estrilda paludicola) is a common species of estrildid finch found in central Africa. It has an estimated global extent of occurrence of 1,800,000 km2. Estrilda paludicola, E. ochrogaster and E. poliopareia have been lumped into E. paludicola (Dowsett and Forbes-Watson 1993).

Taxonomy
The fawn-breasted waxbill was formally described in 1863 by the German explorer and ornithologist Theodor von Heuglin from a specimen collected on the middle course of the Bahr el Ghazal River in South Sudan. He placed the species in the genus Estrilda (which he spelled as Estrelda) and coined the binomial name Estrilda paludicola. The specific epithet paludicola is Latin meaning "marsh-dweller" (from palus, paludis meaning "swamp" and -cola meaning "dweller").

Six subspecies are recognised:

 E. p. paludicola Heuglin, 1863 – east Central African Republic and north DR Congo to west Kenya
 E. p. roseicrissa Reichenow, 1892 – east DR Congo and southwest Uganda to northwest Tanzania
 E. p. marwitzi Reichenow, 1900 – central south Tanzania
 E. p. benguellensis Neumann, 1908 – Angola, south DR Congo and Zambia
 E. p. ruthae Chapin, 1950 – central DR Congo

The subspecies E. p. ochrogaster has sometimes been considered as a separate species, the Abyssinian waxbill.

Distribution and habitat
The fawn-breasted waxbill is commonly found in subtropical/tropical (lowland) wet grassland habitats in Angola, Burundi, Central African Republic, the Democratic Republic of the Congo, Ethiopia, Gabon,  Kenya, Republic of the Congo, Rwanda, Sudan, Tanzania, Uganda and Zambia. However, it also inhabits dry forest and dry shrubland habitats. The IUCN has classified the species as being of least concern.

References

BirdLife International species factsheet 

fawn-breasted waxbill
Birds of Central Africa
Birds of East Africa
fawn-breasted waxbill
Taxa named by Theodor von Heuglin